Tsend-Ayuushiin Ochirbat (born November 19, 1974 in Ulaanbaatar) is a Mongolian judoka, who competed in the men's middleweight category. He held the 2005 Mongolian senior title in his own division, picked up a total of six medals in his career, including a silver from the 2002 Asian Games in Busan, South Korea, and represented his nation Mongolia in two editions of the Olympic Games (2000 and 2004).

Ochirbat made his official debut at the 2000 Summer Olympics in Sydney, where he competed in the men's light-middleweight class (81 kg). He outlasted Burkina Faso's Salifou Koucka Ouiminga and Morocco's Adil Belgaïd in the prelims, before losing out the third match by a single leg takedown (kuchiki taoshi) and an ippon to Uruguay's Alvaro Paseyro.

When South Korea hosted the 2002 Asian Games in Busan, Ochirbat came up strong by chance for his first career gold medal in the 81-kg division, but had to satisfy with the silver after falling to Japan's Yuta Yazaki in the final match.

At the 2004 Summer Olympics in Athens, Ochirbat qualified for his second Mongolian squad in the men's middleweight class (90 kg), based on the nation's entry to the top 22 world rankings for his own category by the International Judo Federation. Ochirbat opened his match with a more satisfying victory over Indonesia's three-time Olympic veteran Krisna Bayu, before he received three penalties for passivity and fell behind in a 0–1 koka score against Brazilian judoka and 2000 Olympic bronze medalist Carlos Honorato at the end of the second round.

References

External links
 

1974 births
Living people
Mongolian male judoka
Olympic judoka of Mongolia
Judoka at the 2000 Summer Olympics
Judoka at the 2004 Summer Olympics
Judoka at the 2002 Asian Games
Judoka at the 2006 Asian Games
Asian Games medalists in judo
Sportspeople from Ulaanbaatar
Asian Games silver medalists for Mongolia
Medalists at the 2002 Asian Games
20th-century Mongolian people
21st-century Mongolian people